Kobin, female form Kobina, is an East Slavic surname. Notable people with this surname include:

 Chris Kobin, screenwriter and film producer living in Los Angeles, California
 Nataliya Kobina (born 1979), Uzbekistani sprinter
 Vasyl Kobin (born 1985), retired Ukrainian football midfielder and manager of Mynai